The 2018 Eisenhower Trophy took place 5–8 September at the Carton House Golf Club in Maynooth, County Kildare, Ireland. It was the 31st World Amateur Team Championship for the Eisenhower Trophy. The tournament was a 72-hole stroke play team event with 72 three-man teams. The best two scores for each round counted towards the team total. Each team played two rounds on the Montgomerie and O'Meara courses. The leading teams played the Montgomerie course on the third day and the O'Meara course on the final day.

Denmark won their first Eisenhower Trophy, a stroke ahead of the United States, who took the silver medal. Spain took the bronze medal while New Zealand, who led after 54 holes, finished fourth.

The 2018 Espirito Santo Trophy was played on the same courses one week prior.

Teams
72 teams contested the event. Each team had three players with the exception of Gabon who were represented by only two players.

The following table lists the players on the leading teams.

Results

Source:

Individual leaders
There was no official recognition for the lowest individual scores.

Source:

References

External links

Coverage on International Golf Federation website 

Eisenhower Trophy
Golf tournaments in the Republic of Ireland
Golf in County Kildare
Eisenhower Trophy
Eisenhower Trophy
Eisenhower Trophy